"Dusk Till Dawn" is a song recorded by English singer and songwriter Zayn featuring Australian singer and songwriter Sia. It was released on 8 September 2017 by RCA Records and appears on the Japanese edition of Zayn's second studio album, Icarus Falls (2018) and the radio edit appears on the 2020 reissue of the album. It was written by Zayn Malik, Sia Furler, Alex Oriet, David Phelan and Greg Kurstin, and produced by Kurstin. The song's accompanying music video was released on the same day and features Zayn and British-American actress Jemima Kirke. The song is featured in the official trailer for the 2017 film The Mountain Between Us. Commercially, the single peaked at number five on the UK Singles Chart. It also topped the charts in seven countries and peaked within the top ten on the charts in more than twenty countries including: Australia, Belgium, Canada, Finland, France, Germany, Ireland, Italy, the Netherlands, New Zealand, Norway, Portugal, Russia, Scotland, Slovenia, and Sweden.

Composition
"Dusk Till Dawn" is a pop power ballad. Fact described the song as a "stadium ballad" adding that "instead of running away from his pop roots [Zayn] seems to be relaxing and re-embracing those pop beginnings".

Speaking of the song, Zayn said, "That's where I started and that's obviously still in there. I still like pop music, but it's about putting my own spin on it, making it me."

The song is in the key of B minor with a tempo of 90 beats per minute. The meter is common time. The harmonic progression is Bm7–G–D–F♯m7/C♯–Bm7–G–D–A/C♯. The vocals span two octaves, from D3 to D5.

Critical reception
"Dusk Till Dawn" received highly positive reviews from music critics. Hugh McIntyre of Forbes magazine said the song is as "epic as it needed to be considering the two powerhouses attached." He noted that it "features powerful vocals, high notes left and right and a vocal hook that is somehow impossible to sing along to, while still being memorable." McIntyre predicted it could be a potential Grammy Award nominee for Best Pop Duo/Group Performance, but, in fact, the song's producer Greg Kurstin won Producer of the Year at the 2018 Grammy Awards for his work on "Dusk Till Dawn" along with several other songs.

Michael Cragg of The Guardian chose the song as "track of the week" and described it as "a towering piece of perfect pop."
Rolling Stones Elias Leight described the song as a "throbbing ballad" and said that the duet "leans close to her [Sia's] trademark style", adding that "Sia dials back her potent voice to harmonize better with Malik; she often handles the low end, while his singing flutters around in the falsetto range." MTV called it a "massive, cinematic duet" and concluded that it "starts off as a gorgeous, romantic mid-tempo and builds to a thrashing sing-along chorus that will echo around stadiums in no time."

Jordan Sargent, writing for Spin, said "Dusk Till Dawn" was "a step backwards" from ZAYN's previous single, "Still Got Time", commenting that the collaboration with Sia was "fairly predictable and mostly uninteresting".

Commercial reception
As of September 2017, "Dusk Till Dawn" had sold around 58,000 digital copies in the United States according to Nielsen SoundScan. The track sold 28,561 downloads in the UK during its first week. By 5 October 2017, the song had sold around 65,000 copies in the United States. In Europe, "Dusk Till Dawn" topped the European Border Breakers chart on the week ending 27 October 2017, and held onto the number-one spot for months; it eventually dropped to number two in the week ending 26 January 2018.

Music video

Synopsis

Directed by Marc Webb, the accompanying music video for "Dusk Till Dawn" premiered on YouTube on 8 September 2017, receiving over 10 million views on its first day. It is Webb's first music video in seven years. The music video finds Zayn on the run from two different groups, after he makes a sly hand-off with his mysterious accomplice played by actress Jemima Kirke. Soon after a brief confrontation, Zayn outwits the law and escapes a pair of gangsters in an intense car chase and eventually lures both parties into a trap and drives off into the sunset with Kirke. Sia does not appear in the music video.
As of January 2022, the video has over 1.8 billion views. 
The video was inspired by the movies Casino and Goodfellas. According to ZAYN, "It’s definitely a nod to a particular era of music videos. The early '90s, around that period, people really tried to make these epic, intense movies for their videos, Michael Jackson being a great example of that. I wanted to come back and give my fans something along those lines rather than just some blasé video."

Reception
Rolling Stones Elias Leight wrote that "Jemima Kirke and Zayn Malik are a modern day Bonnie and Clyde in the new clip" for ZAYN's song. MTV's contributor praised the dramatic visuals and wrote the "Dusk Till Dawn video is a huge step up from his previous music videos and we can’t help but wonder if this is only Part One of the story." Al Horner of Fact described the video as "a Chinatown heist mini-movie crammed into five action-packed minutes." , the music video has received more than 1.8 billion views on YouTube.

Charts

Weekly charts

Year-end charts

Certifications

Release history

References

2017 singles
2017 songs
2010s ballads
Male–female vocal duets
Music videos directed by Marc Webb
Pop ballads
Number-one singles in Austria
Number-one singles in Greece
Number-one singles in Malaysia
Number-one singles in Poland
Number-one singles in Russia
Number-one singles in the Commonwealth of Independent States
Number-one singles in Switzerland
RCA Records singles
Sia (musician) songs
Song recordings produced by Greg Kurstin
Songs written by Greg Kurstin
Songs written by Sia (musician)
Songs written by Zayn Malik
Zayn Malik songs